Below is a list of Sierra Leone  prime ministers, presidents, heads of state and their tribes:

Notes

References

Politics of Sierra Leone